Osa is a canton in the Puntarenas province of Costa Rica. The head city is in Puerto Cortés district.

History 
Osa was created on 29 July 1940 by decree 185. In pre-Columbian times was populated by Boruca which left legacies such as fields and stone walkways.

Geography 
Osa has an area of  km² and a mean elevation of  metres.

The canton begins at the Barú River near Dominical on the central Pacific coast. It continues as a narrow strip of land southward to include the area around Palmar and Sierpe, finally widening to take in the entire neck and upper portion of the Osa Peninsula, where significant gold mining operations are located. As its name suggests, humpback whales and dolphins migrate into the waters to calve, mate, and to rest. Whale watching is available along the coasts. Isla del Caño is part of Osa canton.

Districts 
The canton of Osa is subdivided into the following districts:
 Puerto Cortés
 Palmar
 Sierpe
 Bahía Ballena
 Piedras Blancas
 Bahía Drake

Demographics 

For the 2011 census, Osa had a population of  inhabitants.

Transportation

Road transportation 
The canton is covered by the following road routes:

Conservation and tourism 
In the canton there are conservation areas that are part of the Osa Conservation Area, such as Corcovado National Park, Ballena Marine National Park and Piedras Blancas National Park. The stone spheres of Costa Rica are found in this canton.

References 

Cantons of Puntarenas Province
Populated places in Puntarenas Province